The String Quartet No. 2 in A minor, Op. 13, was composed by Felix Mendelssohn in 1827. Written when he was 18 years old, it was, despite its official number, Mendelssohn's first mature string quartet. One of Mendelssohn's most passionate works, the A minor Quartet is one of the earliest and most significant examples of cyclic form in music.

Movements 

This work has four movements:
 Adagio (A major) – Allegro vivace (A minor, sonata form*)
 Adagio non lento (F major)
 Intermezzo: Allegretto con moto (A minor) – Allegro di molto** (A major)
 Presto*** (A minor) – Adagio non lento (A major)

A typical performance lasts about 28 minutes.

* Mendelssohn originally wrote the repeat sign for the exposition, but later the repeat sign was removed in copyist's manuscript.

** Autograph gives poco più mosso, which is replaced first by Più Presto, then Allegro di molto, in copyist's manuscript.

*** Composer used Molto Allegro in autograph, it was replaced by Presto in copyist's manuscript.

Composition

Though Mendelssohn was still a teenager when he wrote this quartet, he was already an experienced composer of chamber music. He had already written the String Quintet, Op. 18, the Octet for Strings, Op. 20, and three piano quartets, besides several youthful string quartets which remained unpublished. He had a few months before produced his opera Die Hochzeit des Camacho, which was not a success. (His quartet Opus 12, though it bears an earlier opus number, was actually written two years later.)

Mendelssohn wrote the quartet a few months after the death of Ludwig van Beethoven, and the influence of Beethoven's late string quartets (written only shortly before and some of which had not even been published when Mendelssohn started his composition) is evident in this work. Beethoven's late works received a lukewarm reception at best, and many – including Mendelssohn's own father – agreed with composer Louis Spohr that they were an "indecipherable, uncorrected horror". Mendelssohn, however, was fascinated by them: he studied all the scores he could obtain and included several allusions to Beethoven's quartets in Opus 13. But more than being simply a homage to his great predecessor, Mendelssohn's quartet takes the implications of Beethoven's late quartets – above all their suggestions of cyclic formal organization – and develops them in radically new directions. As Benedict Taylor writes in a very detailed analysis, this quartet "is the most thorough-going essay in cyclic form, both by Mendelssohn and by any composer to that time, until the late works of Franck at the very least".

As a unifying motif, Mendelssohn included a quotation from his song "Ist es wahr?" ('Is it true?', Op. 9, no. 1) – "Is it true that you wait for me in the arbour by the vineyard wall?" – composed a few months earlier. Mendelssohn includes the title of the song in the score of the quartet, recalling the title Beethoven wrote on the last movement of his Op. 135 string quartet "Muss es sein?" (Must it be?). But, unlike the introspective, existential quality of Beethoven's quartet, Mendelssohn's work is passionate and richly romantic. "...This quartet, relying heavily on compositional techniques of late Beethoven, links Classical form to Romantic expression," writes Lucy Miller.

Analysis

The three-note motif from "Ist es wahr?", presented in an opening Adagio in the key of A Major, establishes the cyclic form of the quartet; derivatives of the motif appear in all four of the movements, and the opening theme concludes the quartet. After the Adagio introduction, the quartet breaks into a tumultuous Allegro Vivace in Sonata form in A minor. "You will hear its notes resound in the first and last movements, and sense its feeling in all four" wrote Mendelssohn to a friend. So the quartet, which is mostly in minor keys, and is primarily minor in character, opens and closes in a major key – a rather daring departure from standard quartet-writing practice of the time. Many writers have seen a resemblance to Beethoven's Op. 132 quartet: that quartet, also, has an opening adagio, then a first theme built of running sixteenth notes and a lyrical passage, which is loosely akin to an inversion of Mendelssohn's theme.

The Adagio movement has a middle slow, fugal section which is modelled after the fugal middle section of the slow movement of Beethoven's Op. 95. The subjects of both fugues are sinuous melodies that slide down chromatically, moving from viola to second violin and then to the other voices. Like the Beethoven model, the fugue goes through a series of increasingly complex variations with cross-rhythms in the different instruments.

The Intermezzo movement opens with a light, gossamer theme which is Mendelssohn's signature style. The lilting theme in the first violin, with pizzicato accompaniment in the other instruments, recalls the A Midsummer Night's Dream Overture and scherzo movements from many of Mendelssohn's chamber works.

The final movement of Beethoven's Op. 132 quartet is a prototype for the opening of Mendelssohn's last movement: it begins with a cadenza interlude in the first violin, leading into a fast, melodic movement with a driving bass line in the cello which is similar to the cello part of Op. 132.

References

External links 

Performance by the Borromeo String Quartet from the Isabella Stewart Gardner Museum in MP3 format
Lecture and performance on this quartet by Roger Parker and the Badke Quartet, given at Gresham College, 26 June 2008
 , Arcano String Quartet: Erik Sanchez, Mariana Valencia, violins; Miguel Alcantara, viola; Luz Del Carmen Aguila Y Elvira, cello
 , Arcano String Quartet

String quartets by Felix Mendelssohn
1827 compositions
Compositions in A minor